Livingston Ludlow Biddle Jr. (1918 – 2002) was an American author and promoter of funding of the arts, from a wealthy Pennsylvania family.

Life
Livingston Ludlow Biddle was born in Bryn Mawr, Pennsylvania, on May 26, 1918. 
His mother was Euginie Carter Law, and father was Livingston Ludlow Biddle (1877–1959) of the Biddle family of Philadelphia, who published poems such as "The Understanding Hills".
Ancestors included grandfather Edward Biddle (1851–1933) who married Emily Taylor Drexel (1851–1883), daughter of Anthony Joseph Drexel, and great grandfather Nicholas Biddle (1786–1844), linking to two major banking families.
He attended the Montgomery School in Chester Springs, Pennsylvania and St. George's School in Middletown, Rhode Island.
He graduated from Princeton University in 1940, majoring in English and French. He was also on the tennis team.

He went to work as a reporter for the Philadelphia Bulletin newspaper until World War II broke out. Several of his cousins and uncles were military leaders, but due to his poor eyesight, he served in the American Field Service as an ambulance driver in Africa. After the war he wrote short stories and four novels set in Philadelphia. From 1963 to 1965 he worked as staff assistant to Senator Claiborne Pell, who was a classmate from both St. George's and Princeton. He helped draft the legislation creating the National Endowment for the Arts (NEA) and the National Endowment for the Humanities. He was appointed by President Jimmy Carter as the third chairman of the NEA in 1977 and served from 1981.

Biddle married Cordelia Fenton who died in 1972.
In 1973 he married artist Catharina Baart (1912–2005), who had been born in the Netherlands. She taught art in the Washington, DC public schools from the 1950s to 1974.

He died May 3, 2002.

Legacy
His daughter from his first marriage, Cordelia Frances Biddle (born 1947), also became an author. A series features the fictitious Philadelphia character Martha Beale.

Works
  From Cosmopolitan

References

1918 births
2002 deaths
American art historians
National Endowment for the Arts
Members of the Philadelphia Club
Princeton University alumni
People from Bryn Mawr, Pennsylvania
Livingston Ludlow Jr.
Drexel family
20th-century American historians
American male non-fiction writers
American Field Service personnel of World War II
St. George's School (Rhode Island) alumni
Historians from Pennsylvania
20th-century American male writers